Bull Lake is a lake in geographic Sheppard Township in Sudbury District, Ontario, Canada. The primary outflow is an unnamed creek to Rawson Lake, and further through a series of lakes, Halleck Lake and Halleck Creek into the Sturgeon River.

References

Lakes of Sudbury District